Perets ("Pepper") is a Ukrainian satirical and humorous illustrated magazine. Together with the Moscow "Krocodil" (circulation in 1986 5 million copies) "Pepper" (circulation in 1986 3.3 million copies) was one of the two most popular comedy magazines in the USSR.

Red Pepper 
The magazine was founded in the then capital of the Ukrainian SSR, Kharkiv, as Червоний Перець ("Red Pepper") in 1927. It moved to Kyiv in 1941. Literary critics associate the development of satire and humor in the first years after 1917 with two factors: the artistic creativity of the masses, called by the revolution to active social construction, and the satirical, mostly political and agitation speeches of Mayakovsky and Demyan Bedny. Ukrainian humor was evaluated as a motivating example. Satirical poems, humoresque, and fables directed against the White Guard and the foreign counterrevolution were published in the pages of the Red Army and civilian newspapers. At the same time, satirical publications imbued with anti-Bolshevik and anti-interventionist pathos appeared in the press of the opposite camp, testifying to the hopes of the part of the masses that associated the social liberation and national revival of Ukraine with the building of an independent Ukraine. In the science of literature, this array of satire and humor, except for a few studies, was mostly not taken into account by researchers and not studied.

The first two issues of the Red Pepper magazine were published in Kharkiv in 1922. Ostap Vyshnya took part in the organization and editing of the magazine together with Vasyl Ellan-Blakytny. Unfortunately, due to economic difficulties, the third issue did not come out.

The magazine was restored as a biweekly called "Red Pepper", published in Ukrainian in 1927-1934 in Kharkiv as a supplement to the "News of the All-Ukrainian Central Executive Committee", editor - Vasyl Chechvyansky, circulation - 27,150 copies.

Main employees: Ostap Vyshnya, Yuriy Vukhnal (Ivan Kovtun), Yukhym Gedz (Oleksa Savitsky), Antosha Ko (A. Gak), B. Simantsiv, K. Kotko (M. Lyubchenko) and others. The great popularity of the magazine was ensured by Ostap Vyshnya, who, according to some literary critics, was the most popular writer after Taras Shevchenko.

Illustrators: O. Khvostenko-Khvostov, O. Dovzhenko, A. Petritsky, K. Agnit, O. Kozyurenko, L. Kaplan and others.

It has a circulation of around 13.000 copies, well below of its peak of 3.000.000 in the late 1970s when it was close to rivaling the now-defunct Moscow-based Russian-language magazine Krokodil.

References

External links
 Website of the newspaper
 Archive 1952-1990 

Newspapers published in the Soviet Union 
Newspapers published in Ukraine
Publications established in 1927
Ukrainian-language newspapers
1927 establishments in Ukraine
Mass media in Kyiv
Mass media in Kharkiv
Satirical magazines